Squish is a commercial cross-platform GUI and regression testing tool that can test applications based on a variety of GUI technologies (see list below). It is developed and maintained by Froglogic.

Overview 
Squish is developed and maintained by Froglogic. Version 1.0 was released on 18 November 2003. Squish uses property-based object identification (independent of screen position), and is able to record and replay test scripts written in JavaScript, Perl, Python, Ruby or Tcl. It is a two-component system, consisting of a runner, which interprets and executes scripts, and a server, which hooks in and controls the application under test (AUT) by injecting a module into it that provides a TCP/IP connection between the AUT and the program running the test. Both components work on Windows, Linux, several Unix variants, Mac OS X, iOS, Android, Windows CE and QNX and other RTOSes.

As of version 6.0, the Squish GUI Tester fully integrates support for behavior-driven development (BDD) and testing extended by special functionality to apply this to GUI tests. Squish is compatible with the Gherkin (domain-specific language) used in tools such as Cucumber.

Squish is shipped with the full source code.

According to Froglogic, Squish is used by more than 3,000 companies.

In May 2012, Squish won Dr. Dobb's Jolt Productivity Award.

Supported GUI technologies 
According to Froglogic, Squish supports the following platforms:

 Qt, QML, QtQuick
 Java SWT/Eclipse RCP
 Java AWT/Swing
 JavaFX
 Windows MFC, .NET Windows Forms and WPF
 Mac OS X Carbon/Cocoa
 iOS Cocoa Touch
 Web/HTML/AJAX
 Flex
 Android
 XView
 Tk

See also
List of GUI testing tools

References

External links
 

Graphical user interface testing
Software testing